Varna Airport  is the airport of Varna, the historical maritime capital of Bulgaria. Varna Airport is the third largest airport in Bulgaria. It is located 10 kilometers from the center of Varna near the town of Aksakovo. The airport serves Varna, Golden Sands and northeastern Bulgaria. The busiest season for the airport is from the end of May to the beginning of October.

History
The history of the airport dates back to 1916 when two sheds for the first hydro-port in Bulgaria were built in the Peinerdzhik area (present-day Chaika residential area).  Irregular mail-plane service from Sofia to Varna was held between 1919 and 1920 and it was not until 1947 that a permanent airline between the two cities was established. What had grown into Tihina Airport was situated west of the present-day Asparuhov bridge and was indeed quite primitive for the demands of a modern city.  Thus in 1946 a decision was made and a new airport was constructed several kilometres west of the city, near the village (now town) of Aksakovo, with local people enthusiastically working on the site together with the constructors. Construction and improvement continued throughout the years, with a new terminal built in 1972 and a new runway in 1974. 

In 2013, a new passenger terminal opened and the one constructed in the 20th century was closed down.

There are domestic and international flights from Varna to about 70 destinations in 25 countries, with Bulgarian and foreign airlines. The airport is close to the Port of Varna and the railway system. The airport has one asphalt-covered runway 09/27 with ILS CAT I system on 09 edge and a parking apron for 24 aircraft.
In June 2006 the Bulgarian Government awarded Fraport AG Frankfurt Airport Services Worldwide a 35-year-long concession on both Varna and Burgas airports in return for investments exceeding €500 million, including a new passenger terminal by 2008.

From 15 October 2011 until 28 February 2012, Varna airport was closed for a reconstruction of the runway. All flights were operated to/from Burgas Airport.

In 2016 the airport handled 1,689,595 passengers - a 20.8% increase compared to 2015.

Terminals
The airport has three terminals: Terminal 1, built in 1972 (closed), Terminal 3 (opened in June 2007), which was used during the summer season, and the new Terminal 2, opened in August 2013.

Terminal 1
Terminal 1 (closed) was extended several times over the years. The departures area had 21 check-in counters and six security checkpoints. In the terminal there were various outlets: cafes, fast food restaurants, currency exchange, and duty-free shops. There were ten boarding gates. The arrivals area had two luggage belts, as well as currency exchange and a tax-free shop. Terminal 1 still has a VIP room and business lounge. In 2010 the VIP room was renovated. As of 2014, all flights, including no-frills, are managed by Terminal 2. Hence, the old terminal is closed except the VIP area.

Terminal 2
Terminal 2 started operations on 18 August 2013. In December 2011 the construction work on the new Terminal 2 began. T2 has a capacity of 1,800,000 passengers per year and 25 check-in desks. It covers an area of 18,000 square metres. T2's buildings are designed so that their capacity can be increased as an extension to the existing architectural part. The first passenger service on T2 was a domestic flight to Sofia operated by the national carrier Bulgaria Air and first international passengers served were on a Belavia flight from Minsk. T2 was designed by London-based architecture firm Pascall+Watson.

Airlines and destinations

The following airlines operate regular scheduled and charter flights at Varna Airport:

Statistics

Traffic

Ground transport

Bus line 409 connects the airport with Varna city center and resorts nearby (route: Varna Airport – Mall Varna – Varna Bus Station / Grand Mall – City Center – Saints Constantine and Helena - Golden Sands).

Incidents and accidents
 On 5 June 1992, Balkan Bulgarian Airlines Tupolev 154B overran runway 27 in bad weather conditions. There were no casualties, but the plane was written off.
 On 24 May 2013, Air VIA flight 502 from Leipzig/Halle to Varna overran runway 09 at Varna Airport after touchdown. Two passengers were injured during evacuation.
 On July 8, 2014, Lars Mittank, a German vacationing in Golden Sands, mysteriously disappeared near Varna Airport. Mittank had been alone in Bulgaria the previous two days and reported to be behaving strangely, and was last seen on security cameras fleeing from the airport into the surrounding forest.

See also
 List of airports in Bulgaria
 List of airlines of Bulgaria
 List of the busiest airports in Europe by passenger traffic

References

External links

 Varna Airport Homepage
 History of Varna Airport

Airports in Bulgaria
Buildings and structures in Varna Province
Tourism in Varna, Bulgaria